The Arts Academy at Benjamin Rush (also known as Benjamin Rush, Rush Arts, or simply Rush) is a public, magnet high school located in Philadelphia, Pennsylvania. Rush Arts opened in September 2008 after a two-year remodeling (it was previously a middle school) and typically has about 630 students each year with roughly 500 females and 130 males.  It is generally one of the top 10 schools in the School District of Philadelphia each year when state rankings are published.  For yearly demographic and performance data, visit https://schoolprofiles.philasd.org/rush/overview.

It also has an overall grade of a "B+" on the website Niche which evaluates the quality of schools natiowide

Academics
Each student at Rush Arts auditions for one specific "major" out of the five that the school offers.  These are the visual arts (which have graphic, media, and fine arts as three subcategories), dance, theatre, instrumental music, and vocals.  Students generally stick with one major throughout their high school career; while they have the option of switching majors, this requires a re-audition and acceptance into that field.

Athletics
The school competes in the Philadelphia Public League which is a part of PIAA District XII.  The school mascot is the knight, while the team colors are purple and black.  Its main athletics webpage is https://rushartsknights.org/

Rush Arts offers 7 Varsity sports for girls and 2 Varsity sports for boys.  The sports offered to girls are  volleyball, soccer, field hockey, basketball, and softball and flag football. The boys sports are basketball and bowling.  This unbalanced offering of sports is due to the make up of the school population which is approximately 66% female.

In addition, due to the low number of males at the school, the school is involved in cooperative partnerships with George Washington High School for boys soccer, football, Wrestling, Volleyball and Lacrosse and a cooperative partnership with Swenson high school for Baseball and all students may compete as independent athletes for the Philadelphia Public League is sports like Tennis, Golf, Cross Country, Swimming and Track and Field.

Furthermore, there are several intramural sports that occur before school, during advisory and after school to help further the opportunity for sports participation including basketball, badminton, soccer, volleyball, football, hockey and ultimate frisbee.

Extracurricular activities
Since its establishment, The Arts Academy at Benjamin Rush has offered a number of extracurricular activities for students to participate in. Among these are:

Relationships First
United Minorities Council
Spirit Council
Student Council
GSA
Chemistry club (with tutoring)
Jazz band
Journalism club
Manga/anime club
Mathletes club/tutoring
Model United Nations (UN)
Scrabble club
 Trashion club (fashion club)
Anime club

In addition, many teachers will stay after school on specified days to aid students academically.

References
https://rush.philasd.org/
https://schoolprofiles.philasd.org/rush/overview
https://rushartsknights.org/

Schools in Philadelphia
High schools in Philadelphia
Educational institutions established in 2008
Public high schools in Pennsylvania
Magnet schools in Pennsylvania
2008 establishments in Pennsylvania
Northeast Philadelphia